Simon of Faversham (also Simon Favershamensis, Simon de Faverisham, Simon von Faversham, or Simon Anglicus; c. 1260–1306) was an English medieval scholastic philosopher and later a university chancellor.

Simon of Faversham was born in Faversham, Kent,  and educated at Oxford, receiving a Master of Arts degree. He probably taught in Paris during the 1280s. His philosophical work consists almost entirely of commentaries on Aristotle's works.  He was made Chancellor of Oxford University in January 1304 until his death in 1306.

References

External links
 
 John Longeway's page on Simon of Faversham.
 

 

1260 births
Year of birth uncertain
1306 deaths
People from Faversham
Alumni of the University of Oxford
Scholastic philosophers
English philosophers
13th-century philosophers
Chancellors of the University of Oxford
13th-century English people
14th-century English people